Tydeman is a surname. Notable people with the surname include:

Dick Tydeman (born 1951), English footballer
John Tydeman (born 1936), English producer of radio and director of theatre plays

See also
Tideman